The 1997 Guelph municipal election was held on November 10, 1997, in Guelph, Ontario, Canada, to elect the Mayor of Guelph, Guelph City Council and the Guelph members of the Upper Grand District School Board (Public) and Wellington Catholic District School Board. The election was one of many races across the province of Ontario.

Results
Names in bold denotes elected candidates. 
(X) denotes incumbent.

Mayor

Mayoral race

Ward 1

Ward 1 Councillor, 2 To Be Elected

Ward 2

Ward 2 Councillor, 2 To Be Elected

Ward 3

Ward 3 Councillor, 2 To Be Elected

Ward 4

Ward 4 Councillor, 2 To Be Elected

Ward 5

Ward 5 Councillor, 2 To Be Elected

Ward 6

Ward 6 Councillor, 2 To Be Elected

NOTE:  The election results published in the Guelph Mercury on November 11, 1997 show Lynda Prior with 1,708 votes.

Plebiscite

Plebiscite on charity gaming clubs

References

1997 Ontario municipal elections
1997
November 1997 events in Canada